Per Carlén (born 19 November 1960) is a Swedish former handball player and current coach. He is the father of Swedish national handball player Oscar Carlén and Swedish national football player Hilda Carlén. His most recent coaching job was with the defending German champion HSV Hamburg, who sacked him on 29 December 2011.

Player career
Along with, among others, Magnus Wislander, Staffan Olsson, Erik Hajas och Björn Jilsén, Carlén was a key player in Bengt Johansson's successful national team during the 1980s and 1990s. Usually Carlén played line player. During his national career he played 329 games (1032 goals). Ona club level he represented IK Heim, Ystads IF, BM Granollers and Atlético Madrid BM. In 1992 Carlén won a national championship with Ystads IF.

Player clubs
 IFK Skoghall
 HK Drott
 IF Hellton
 IK Heim
 HP Warta
 BM Granollers
 Atlético Madrid BM
 Ystads IF HF

Coaching clubs
 TSV St. Otmar St. Gallen, 2006–2007
 HK Malmö, 2007–2008
 SG Flensburg-Handewitt, 2008–2010
 HSV Hamburg, 2011

Resume
Caps/Goals: 329/1032 mål (1982–1996)
World champion 1990 (in Prague, Czechoslovakia)
European champion 1994
3rd place in the 1993 and 1995 World championships
Swedish champion with Ystads IF HF 1992
Participated in four Summer Olympics: Los Angeles (1984), Seoul (1988), Barcelona (1992) and Atlanta (1996)

See also
List of handballers with 1000 or more international goals

References

1960 births
Living people
Sportspeople from Karlstad
Swedish male handball players
Olympic handball players of Sweden
Handball players at the 1984 Summer Olympics
Handball players at the 1988 Summer Olympics
Handball players at the 1992 Summer Olympics
Handball players at the 1996 Summer Olympics
Olympic silver medalists for Sweden
Swedish handball coaches
Swedish expatriate sportspeople in Spain
Olympic medalists in handball
Medalists at the 1996 Summer Olympics
Medalists at the 1992 Summer Olympics
BM Granollers players